Baptism is a rite of admission into the Christian church.

Baptism may also refer to:

Religion
 Affusion, a method of baptism where water is poured on the head of the person being baptized
 Aspersion, the act of sprinkling with water, especially holy water
 Amrit Sanchar, the Sikh ceremony of initiation or baptism
 Believer's baptism, the Christian practice of baptism as this is understood by many Protestant churches,
 Baptism of Jesus, event marking the beginning of his public ministry
 Baptism for the dead, today commonly refers to the religious practice of baptizing a person on behalf of one who is dead
 Baptism with the Holy Spirit, a term describing baptism (washing or immersion) in or with the Spirit of God
 Baptism (Mormonism), the first of several ordinances
 Immersion baptism, a method of baptism where the person baptized is immersed
 Infant baptism, the practice of baptising infants or young children

Music and poetry
 Baptism (Stefano Battaglia album), 1993
 Baptism (Laibach album), 1987
 Baptism (Lenny Kravitz album), 2004
 Baptism: A Journey Through Our Time, a 1968 Joan Baez album of poetry
 Baptism (band), a black metal band from Finland
 "Baptism" (song), by Kenny Chesney and Randy Travis
 "Baptism", a song by Crystal Castles from Crystal Castles
 Baptize (album), a 2021 album by Atreyu
 Baptized (album), a Daughtry album
 Baptizing (album), a 1978 recording by The Seldom Scene

Other
 Baptism (novel), a 2012 novel by Max Kinnings
 Baptism by fire, a phrase originating from the words of John the Baptist in Matthew 3:11

See also

 
 
 Baptists
 John the Baptist (c. 0 BC – c. 30 AD)
 Baptistery
 Baptismal font
 Khalsa
 Baptism, Eucharist and Ministry
Baptist (disambiguation)